John Ashburnham (by 1483 – 1518/1523), of Guestling and Winchelsea, Sussex and High Halden, Kent, was an English politician.

He was the son of MP, Thomas Ashburnham.

He was a Member of Parliament (MP) for Winchelsea in 1512 and 1515.

References

1483 births
16th-century deaths
English MPs 1512–1514
English MPs 1515
Year of death uncertain
People from High Halden
People from Winchelsea
People from Guestling